The Dassault Super Mystère is a French supersonic fighter-bomber and was the first Western European supersonic aircraft to enter mass production.

Design and development
The Super Mystère represents the final step in evolution which began with the Dassault Ouragan and progressed through the Mystère II/III and Mystère IV. While earlier Mystère variants could attain supersonic speeds only in a dive, the Super Mystère could exceed the speed of sound in level flight. This was achieved thanks to the new thin wing with 45° of sweep (compared with 41° of sweep in the Mystère IV and only 33° in Mystère II) and the use of an afterburner-equipped turbojet engine.

The first prototype Super Mystère B.1, powered by a Rolls-Royce Avon RA.7R, took to the air on 2 March 1954.  The aircraft broke the sound barrier in level flight the following day.

As the Super Mystère B2, sometimes known as the SMB2, the aircraft entered production in 1957.  The production version differed from the prototype by having a more powerful SNECMA Atar 101G engine. A total of 180 Super Mystère B2s were built.

In 1958, two Super Mystère B.4 prototypes were built. Equipped with a new 48° swept wing and a more powerful SNECMA Atar 9B engine, the aircraft were capable of Mach 1.4. Production never materialized because the faster Dassault Mirage III was entering service.

In 1973, the Israeli Air Force and Honduras Air Force upgraded their Super Mystère B2s with a non-afterburning version of the Pratt & Whitney J52-P8A, extended tailpipe, and new avionics. In Israeli service these upgraded SMB2s were also known as the IAI Sa'ar (after a Hebrew word meaning "storm").

Operational history

France 
The SMB2 was assigned to three fighter squadrons (5th, 10th and 12th) starting in May 1958. In November 1977, the last SMB2 of the 1/12 Cambrésis fighter squadron made its last flight, thus closing 19 years of service with the Armée de l'Air. About fifteen aircraft from this squadron were then assigned to the Rochefort air technician school. Aircraft no.90 12-YQ was assigned to the Cité de l'Air Military Training Center, at 122 Chartres-Champhol Air Base.

Israel
The Israeli Air Force  acquired 24 Super Mystères in 1958.

Israeli Super Mystères  were involved in a controversial incident in which the USS Liberty was attacked. The aircraft saw action in the 1967 Six-Day War and the 1973 Yom Kippur War in which 6 were lost.

Super Mystères were well-liked by Israeli pilots, and were regarded as good match for the MiG-19 operated by opponents in air-to-air combat.

Honduras
In 1976, Honduras bought 12 complete Super Mystère airframes from Israel. In 1979, Honduras purchased four more aircraft.

These provided air support in numerous border skirmishes with Sandinistan Nicaragua, and served until in 1996, replaced by 12 Northrop F-5Es. One Super Mystère was transferred to the Honduras Air Museum, and the remaining 11 were offered for sale as surplus.

Operators

 French Air Force

 Honduras Air Force

 Israeli Air Force
 105 Squadron

Specifications (Super Mystère B2)

See also

References

Bibliography
 
 
 

Super Mystère
1950s French fighter aircraft
Single-engined jet aircraft
Cruciform tail aircraft
Low-wing aircraft
Aircraft first flown in 1955